Schuylar Oordt (born May 26, 1987) is a former American football tight end. He was signed by the St. Louis Rams as an undrafted free agent in 2011. He played college football at University of Northern Iowa.

He was also a member of the Jacksonville Jaguars, Washington Redskins and Omaha Nighthawks.

Professional career

St. Louis Rams
Oordt signed with the St. Louis Rams on July 29, 2011. He was waived on August 28.

Jacksonville Jaguars
He was signed to the Jacksonville Jaguars' practice squad on October 12, 2011. He released from the practice squad on November 14.

Washington Redskins
The Washington Redskins signed him to their practice squad on December 20, 2011. He was let go after the season.

Carolina Panthers
On May 11, 2012, he went to Rookie minicamp with the Carolina Panthers, but was not signed.

External links
St. Louis Rams Bio
Jacksonville Jaguars Bio
Washington Redskins Bio
Just Sports Stats

References

1987 births
Living people
Sportspeople from Waterloo, Iowa
Players of American football from Iowa
University of Northern Iowa alumni
Northern Iowa Panthers football players
American football tight ends
St. Louis Rams players
Jacksonville Jaguars players
Washington Redskins players
Omaha Nighthawks players